Summersville School District 79 or Summersville Grade School 79 (SGS) is a school district, consisting of a single K-8 school, in Mount Vernon, Illinois.

In 2013 the district was one of several to receive grants from the 2013 School District Library program.

References

External links
 
School districts in Illinois
Education in Jefferson County, Illinois
Public K–8 schools in Illinois